Tannaker Buhicrosan (タナカー・ブヒクロサン) (25 February 1839 – 10 August 1894), christened Frederik "Frank" Eduard Marie Martinus Blekman, and also known as Furederikku Burekkuman, was a Dutch-Japanese translator, international businessman and promoter best known for operating the Japanese Village exhibition erected in Knightsbridge from 1885 to 1887.

Early years
Buhicrosan was born in Amsterdam on 25 February 1839, the son of Susanna Catharina née van der Hulst (born 1814) and Eduard Matthijs Nicolaas Blekman (born 1815). Travelling first via Australia and New Zealand, Blekman arrived in Nagasaki in 1859, living among the foreign community in Nagasaki. Still known as Blekman at the time, he was hired first by the British Legation as a Dutch translator in 1861 for the Shimonoseki area and later to represent the French in talks with the second Japanese Ambassadorial European dispatch in 1864–1866, as Dutch was the language the Japanese used to negotiate treaties at this time. However, he caused financial strife between the French and Shogunal authorities by inflating the asking price for French warships to divert the excess payment to his trading company and was dismissed as their intermediary Dutch interpreter.

With a warrant out for his arrest in Japan he fled to San Francisco and began anew, putting together his first entertainment troupe in 1867, eventually going on tour. By 1871 he was in Britain as the "Professional Manager of a Japanese Troupe", lodging at Luton in Bedfordshire with his Japanese wife Omoto Blekman (née Kagami, 1843–1916) and nine other Japanese people. Capitalising on the craze for "all things Japan", he primarily focused on promoting his "Japanese Entertainment" performances (popularised by the San Francisco Japanese community), taking the moniker Tannaker Buhicrosan (perhaps part of Japanese Expat pidgin). Buhicrosan began to sell "Japanese products" such as umbrellas and began to demonstrate real Japanese craftsmen and their works in the show in mock-up traditional "Old Japan" style houses (a popular 19th century infantile notion of Japan) with food stalls and another "Japanese" temple attached. In 1874 Buhicrosan moved to London. In 1878 Blekman appeared in court in Southampton in Hampshire, charged with obtaining money under false pretences, but was acquitted. In 1879 he married a British-Japanese woman, Ruth Otake Buchirosan (1851–1914), settling in Hither Lane, Lewisham, London, where they had 10 children.

Japanese village, Knightsbridge
In premises in Milton Street, Finsbury, in December 1883 Buhicrosan 'set up The Japanese Native Village Exhibition and Trading Company Limited with a number of associates, including Cornelius B. Pare, a Japan and China merchant in the city, Ambrose Austin, a concert agent, and John Miles, a Wardour Street printer. ... Buhicrosan was to receive a salary of at least £1,000' from his new trading venture. Buhicrosan in January 1885 opened the Japanese Village in Knightsbridge, London, at Humphreys' Hall, attracting great success with 250,000 visitors, the popularity of which was boosted by Gilbert and Sullivan's comic opera hit, The Mikado, which opened in March 1885. The village burned down in May, causing surrounding property damage and killing a Japanese carpenter. The troupe had already been engaged to appear at the 1885 International Hygiene Exhibition in Berlins Exhibition Park. In December 1885 the village reopened in London with 'several streets of shops ... two temples and various free-standing idols, and a pool spanned by a rustic bridge'. The village employed over 100 people, such as Japanese craftsmen, performers and artisans in London. The novelty had worn off on the public by 1887, and the village was closed in June.

Last years and death
After that Buhicrosan toured England, dying in 1894 in Lewisham. Blekman died in London in 1888.

References

External links
Cultural Appropriation or Swiftian Satire? Gilbert and Sullivan’s The Mikado

1839 births
1894 deaths
Dutch translators
Businesspeople from Amsterdam
19th-century translators